Mole (Czech: Krtek, Krteček) is an animated character in a series of cartoons created by Czech animator Zdeněk Miler. The premiere of the first short film with Mole took place at the Venice Film Festival in 1957. Since its inception, the cartoon has gained enormous popularity in many Central European countries, as well as India, China, Kazakhstan, Croatia, Denmark, Norway, Finland, Russia, Ukraine, Belarus, Iran, Iraq, and Japan.

History
Krtek was first seen in 1956 in Prague, when Miler wanted to create a children's cartoon about how flax is processed. He wanted a strong Disney influence to the cartoon by choosing an animal for the leading role, and decided to pick a mole after stumbling over a molehill during a walk. The first film, called "Jak krtek ke kalhotkám přišel" ("How the mole got his trousers"), had its premiere at the Venice Film Festival in 1957, where it was awarded two Golden Lions. Production of further episodes started in 1963 and since then, around fifty episodes have been created.

The first episode of the cartoon was narrated, but Miler wanted the cartoon to be understood in every country of the world, so he decided to use his daughters as voice actors, reducing the speech to short non-figurative exclamations in order to express the mole's feelings and world perception. Miler's daughters also became the bottleneck of the creation process as they were the ones who got to see the whole film first, thus Miler was able to decide whether the message of the movie was able to get to children or not.

In the United Kingdom, the cartoons were transmitted by the BBC with English narration by Colin Jeavons.

Recent developments

Inclusion on US Space Shuttle flight
On 16 May 2011, a plush toy of Krtek was present on board the Space Shuttle Endeavour, where it accompanied the U.S. astronaut Andrew J. Feustel, whose wife is of Czech ancestry, on the STS-134 mission.

US toy market plans
In May 2012, Bloomberg announced that Apple Inc. planned to help Krtek enter the $21 billion U.S. toy market for the first time.

Mascot
Mole was the mascot for the 2015 European Athletics Indoor Championships in Prague, and was subsequently used to promote the Federation's Athletics for Children programme.

CGI adaptation
In 2016, China Central Television Animation and Little Mole a.s. (founded by Zdeněk Miler's granddaughter, Karolína Milerová) created a remake version called Krtek a Panda. The show ran until 2019.

Alfa Romeo Racing partnership
On 23 May 2019, Alfa Romeo Racing, a Formula One team, announced Krtek as the new team partner. Frédéric Vasseur, principal of the team, said that the goal of the partnership is to capture the imagination of hundreds of thousands of children and get them closer to the sport using Krtek's big follower base all over the world. Mole's iconic figure is appearing on the sidepods of the cars for the rest of the 2019 season.

Music
Music plays an important role in the cartoons, since the characters almost never utter more than emotional sounds, the most common of which is "Ahoj!" ("Hello" in Czech). The original series' music uses acoustic and electric musical instruments, rather than synthesized ones.

Composers
 Miloš Vacek
 Vadim Petrov (1974–1994, most episodes)

Filmography
 From 2002 to 2004, a set of 60 DVDs entitled "Nejlepších večerníčků" (Best Bedtime Stories) was released, some of which included Krtek animations. Included in the list below are the DVD numbers for films in this set.
 A DVD set with all 63 episodes called "приключения Крота" (Mole adventure) was produced for Russian audiences.
 IMDB Episode List

International broadcast
  Germany
 ARD in Die Sendung mit der Maus

See also
 Czech animation
 Cinema of the Czech Republic

References

External links

 
 Big Cartoon Database – Krtek episode info
 Little Mole fan website 

Animal characters in films
Film characters introduced in 1956
Film series introduced in 1957
Czech animation
Czech culture
Fictional Czech people
Fictional moles
Animated film series